Zenia Mucha (born 1957) is an American businesswoman who was the Senior Executive Vice President and Chief Communications Officer of The Walt Disney Company.

Early life and education 
Mucha was born in Poland to Ukrainian parents who spent time in work camps in Nazi Germany. She immigrated to New York City at age 9. Mucha graduated from the lower East side St. George Ukrainian Catholic School.  Mucha studied political science at Brooklyn College.

Career 
Mucha began her professional career in politics, serving as communications director and campaign manager for U.S. Senator Al D'Amato. She took leaves to work on the campaigns of Ronald Reagan and George H. W. Bush. She later worked as the director of communications and as an influential senior policy advisor to Governor of New York George Pataki.

Mucha joined the Walt Disney Company in 2001, as Senior Vice President of Communications for the ABC Broadcast Group and the American Broadcasting Company.

Since 2002, Mucha has led communications for all of Disney’s strategic business initiatives including the acquisitions of Pixar, Marvel and Lucasfilm. Under Mucha's leadership, Disney launched D23, the first-ever official Disney fan club, with members in 50 U.S. states and 35 countries.

In July 2021 it was announced that Mucha opted not to renew her $4.9 million contract with Disney, and she left the company in early 2022 after nearly 20 years.

Awards 
In 2012, Mucha received the Matrix Award from New York Women in Communications. In 2017, she was inducted into the PRWeek Hall of Fame.

References

External links 

 The Walt Disney Company Profile

1957 births
Polish emigrants to the United States
New York (state) Republicans
Disney executives
Disney people
Living people
Brooklyn College alumni